Courcouronnes is a former commune in the southern suburbs of Paris, France. On 1 January 2019, it was merged into the new commune Évry-Courcouronnes.

History

A 19th century aqueduct, which brings drinking water from the rivers Vanne and Loing to the city of Paris, crosses the outskirts of Courcouronnes.

Economy
Arianespace, a commercial company that sells the Ariane rockets, is based there. Carrefour's Hypermarket division is based in the city.

Accor was formerly headquartered in Courcouronnes.

Education

There are the following schools:
Six primary schools: Jules Ferry, Paul Bert, Vincent van Gogh, Paul Gauguin, Jacques Brel, and Jacques Tati - Another school, Ecole Frédéric Mistral, is in nearby Lisses
Collège Paul Fort, a junior high school
Lycée Georges Brassens, a senior high school/sixth-form college

Parks and recreation  

Parc-du-Lac Courcouronnes is a relatively large park with a walking trail and a small lake. It is home to the famous "Dame du Lac" climbing wall constructed by architect Pierre Skelezy in 1975. The wall has long since been closed to the public, however trespassers continue to use it regularly. The wall was made famous by its appearance in television broadcasts about the sport of Parkour, which was developed in Lisses and Évry-Courcouronnes by David Belle.

See also

Communes of the Essonne department

References

External links

Official website 

Former communes of Essonne
Populated places disestablished in 2019
States and territories disestablished in 2019